Sheung Wan Civic Centre is a performing arts centre located in the Sheung Wan Municipal Services Building, on Queen's Road Central, Sheung Wan, Hong Kong. It is a popular theatre venue in Hong Kong.

Sheung Wan Civic Centre is one of the subsidiary community arts centres under the Leisure and Cultural Services Department, offers 9 hiring units: Theatre, Lecture Hall, Exhibition Hall, Rehearsal Hall, Dance Practice Room, Art Studio 1 & 2 and Music Practice Room 1 & 2. All are suitable for various types of cultural and arts activities.

Facilities
 Theatre: 480 seats, stage area 10m X 10m
 Lecture Hall: 150 seats, stage area 6.9m X 4.5m
 Exhibition Hall: Area = 360m2
 Rehearsal Hall: Area = 224m2
 Dance Practice Room
 Art Studios = 28m2
 Music Practice Rooms = 14m2

External links
 Official website

Indoor arenas in Hong Kong
Music venues in Hong Kong
Sheung Wan
Theatres in Hong Kong